The traditional Chinese calendar divides a year into 24 solar terms. Lìqiū, Risshū, Ipchu, or Lập thu is the 13th solar term. It begins when the Sun reaches the celestial longitude of 135° and ends when it reaches the longitude of 150°. It more often refers in particular to the day when the Sun is exactly at the celestial longitude of 135°. In the Gregorian calendar, it usually begins around August 7 and ends around August 23.

Liqiu signifies the beginning of autumn in East Asian cultures.

Date and time

References

Autumn
13